Cape Douglas is an ice-covered cape marking the south side of the entrance to Matterson Inlet, on the west side of the Ross Ice Shelf. It was discovered by the British National Antarctic Expedition (1901–04) and named for Admiral Sir Archibald Lucius Douglas, Lord of the Admiralty, who persuaded the Admiralty to assign naval seamen to the expedition.

References 

Headlands of the Ross Dependency
Shackleton Coast